Orachrysops is an Afrotropical genus of butterflies in the family Lycaenidae.

Species
 Orachrysops ariadne (Butler, 1898)
 Orachrysops brinkmani Heath, 1997
 Orachrysops lacrimosa (Bethune-Baker, 1923)
 Orachrysops mijburghi Henning & Henning, 1994
 Orachrysops montanus Henning & Henning, 1994
 Orachrysops nasutus Henning & Henning, 1994
 Orachrysops niobe (Trimen, 1862)
 Orachrysops regalis Henning & Henning, 1994
 Orachrysops subravus Henning & Henning, 1994
 Orachrysops violescens Henning & Henning, 1994
 Orachrysops warreni Henning & Henning, 1994

External links
Orachrysops at Markku Savela's Lepidoptera and some other life forms

 
Butterfly genera
Taxonomy articles created by Polbot